Leelanau County is a county located in the U.S. state of Michigan. As of the 2020 Census, the population was 22,301. Since 2008, the county seat has been located within Suttons Bay Township, one mile east of the unincorporated village of Lake Leelanau. Before 2008, Leelanau County's seat was Leland. Leelanau County is included in the Traverse City Micropolitan Statistical Area of Northern Michigan. The largest settlement in Leelanau County by population is Greilickville, itself a suburb of Traverse City.

East of Leelanau County is Grand Traverse Bay, a bay of Lake Michigan.

In 2011, the Sleeping Bear Dunes National Lakeshore, located in the county, won the title of "Most Beautiful Place in America" in a poll by morning news show Good Morning America.

Etymology 
Traditionally, the county's name was said to be a Native American word meaning "delight of life", but it is a neologism from Indian agent and ethnographer Henry Schoolcraft, who sometimes gave the name "Leelinau" to Native American women in his tales. He created many faux Indian place names in Michigan, using syllables of Ojibwe, Latin and Arabic, neglecting the fact that the Ojibwa language lacks any of the phonemes associated with the letter 'L' in English.

More recently, however, scholars have established that Leelinau was first used as a pen name by Henry's wife, Jane Johnston Schoolcraft, in writings for The Literary Voyager, a family magazine which they co-wrote in the 1820s. Jane Johnston was of Ojibwa and Scots-Irish descent, and wrote in Ojibwe and English. While her writing was not published formally in her lifetime (except as Schoolcraft appropriated it under his own name), Jane Johnston Schoolcraft has been recognized as "the first Native American literary writer, the first known Indian woman writer, the first known Indian poet, the first known poet to write poems in a Native American language, and the first known American Indian to write out traditional Indian stories. In 2008 Jane Johnston Schoolcraft was inducted into the Michigan Women's Hall of Fame.

History 

Leelanau County was separated as an unorganized county in 1840 by the Michigan Legislature. In 1851, it was attached the Grand Traverse County for governmental purposes, and was temporarily given the name "Leelanau Township". In 1863, Leelanau County was organized in its own right. The same year, the southern portion of Leelanau County was separated as Benzie County, and was subsequently attached to Grand Traverse County until 1869.

Sleeping Bear Dunes National Lakeshore was established in 1970, protecting the much of the natural scenery of the area at the federal level.

In 2008, the county seat moved from Leland to a site in Suttons Bay Township, near the town of Lake Leelanau.

Culture

Wineries
There are 26 wineries on the peninsula. The Leelanau Peninsula sits astride the 45th parallel, a latitude known for growing prestigious grapes. The two Grand Traverse Bays provide the ideal maritime climate and the rich soil does the rest. Northern Michigan specializes in growing white grapes and is known for its rieslings which grow well in the summer months and late fall. The local wineries host an annual harvest fest in October. Some riesling grapes are spared being picked in the fall to be picked when they freeze, from which Ice Wine is made. Wineries in the Leelanau Peninsula AVA include Leelanau Cellars, Silver Leaf Vineyard and Winery, Raftshol Vineyards, Circa Estate Winery, Forty-Five North Vineyard and Winery, Good Harbor Vineyards, Chateau Fontaine, Boskydel Vineyards, Black Star Farms, L. Mawby Vineyards, Ciccone Vineyard and Winery, Willow Vineyards, Chateau de Leelanau Winery and Cidery, Shady Lane Cellars, Cherry Republic Winery, Longview Winery, and Bel Lago Winery.

Geography

The peninsula forms the western shore of the Grand Traverse Bay. Leelanau County is one of a handful of counties in the United States that is entirely peninsular, a list also including Huron County elsewhere in Michigan, nearby Door County in Wisconsin, and San Francisco in California.

The county has the second-highest proportion of water area of any county in the United States, behind only Keweenaw County, Michigan. Lake Leelanau is the county's largest body of inland water, empties into Lake Michigan through the Leland River. Glen Lake, located within the boundaries of Sleeping Bear Dunes National Lakeshore, is considered one of the most beautiful lakes in the world. A substantial portion of Sleeping Bear Dunes National Lakeshore lies within the county's borders, including North Manitou and South Manitou Islands. Leelanau has been party to substantial efforts to protect itself from growth, and to foster a nature conservancy.

Extreme southeastern Leelanau County, specifically portions of Elmwood Township, are urbanized due to their proximity to Traverse City, which itself extends partially into the county. Traverse City is the largest city in Northern Michigan by population.

Adjacent counties 
By land

 Grand Traverse County (southeast)
 Benzie County (southwest)

By water
 Schoolcraft County (north)
 Charlevoix County (northeast)
 Antrim County (east)
 Door County, Wisconsin (west, Central Time Zone border)
 Delta County (northwest)

Transportation

Major highways
  is the main highway that loops around most of Leelanau County, following the Lake Michigan shoreline.
M-72 runs west to its western terminus with M-22 in Empire.
  is a highway in the northwestern part of the county. M-109 loops around the western end of Glen Lake, connecting with M-22 at both ends.
  is a short highway from Northport, connecting to various different county roads.
  is an east–west highway that runs across the northeastern tip of the county, connecting with M-22 at both ends.
  is a former state trunkline that went from M-109 to the Coast Guard Life Saving Station in Glen Haven. Until it was decommissioned, it was Michigan's shortest highway.<ref>{{google maps |url = https://www.google.com/maps/place/Leelanau+County,+MI/@44.7507926,-86.0286119,11z/data=!4m5!3m4!1s0x4d4b32c2734505c1:0x168fe38eabdb23f9!8m2!3d45.0821226!4d-86.0733634 |title = Leelanau County MI Google |access-date = September 16, 2018 }}</ref>

Government
Leelanau County has been reliably Republican since its organization, but appears to be becoming more Democratic. Since 1884, the Republican Party nominee has carried the county vote in 30 of 35 national elections through 2020. However, in 2020 the county voted for Joe Biden, after it voted for Donald Trump in the 2016 election.

Leelanau County operates the County jail, maintains rural roads, operates the major local courts, records deeds, mortgages, and vital records, administers public health regulations, and participates with the state in the provision of social services. The county board of commissioners controls the budget and has limited authority to make laws or ordinances. In Michigan, most local government functions – police and fire, building and zoning, tax assessment, street maintenance etc. – are the responsibility of individual cities and townships.

Leelenau County recently completed construction of a new jail.

 Elected officials 

 Prosecuting Attorney – Joseph T. Hubbell
 Probate Judge – Marian Kromkowski
 Sheriff – Michael Borkovich
 County Clerk – Michelle L. Crocker
 County Treasurer – John A. Gallagher
 Register of Deeds – Dorothy M. Miller
 Drain Commissioner – Steven R. Christensen
 Commissioner Dist. 1 – Jamie Kramer
 Commissioner Dist. 2 – James O'Rourke 
 Commissioner Dist. 3 – Doug Rexroat
 Commissioner Dist. 4 – Ty Wessell
 Commissioner Dist. 5 – Kama Ross
 Commissioner Dist. 6 – Gwenne Allgaier
 Commissioner Dist. 7 – Melinda Lautner

(information as of September 2018)

Demographics

As of the 2000 United States Census, there were 21,119 people, 8,436 households, and 6,217 families residing in the county. There were 13,297 housing units at an average density of 38 per square mile (15/km2). The racial makeup of the county was 93.52% White, 0.25% Black or African American, 3.66% Native American, 0.24% Asian, 0.02% Pacific Islander, 1.34% from other races, and 0.97% from two or more races. 3.29% of the population were Hispanic or Latino of any race. 23.3% were of German, 11.5% English, 9.9% Polish, 9.0% Irish, 6.0% French and 5.2% American ancestry. 95.1% spoke English and 2.9% Spanish as their first language.

There were 8,436 households, out of which 29.90% had children under the age of 18 living with them, 63.60% were married couples living together, 7.10% had a female householder with no husband present, and 26.30% were non-families. 22.30% of all households were made up of individuals, and 8.80% had someone living alone who was 65 years of age or older. The average household size was 2.48 and the average family size was 2.89.

The county population contained 24.40% under the age of 18, 5.70% from 18 to 24, 24.20% from 25 to 44, 28.30% from 45 to 64, and 17.40% who were 65 years of age or older. The median age was 43 years. For every 100 females, there were 99.50 males. For every 100 females age 18 and over, there were 97.10 males.

The median income for a household in the county was $47,062, and the median income for a family was $53,228. Males had a median income of $35,719 versus $25,778 for females. The per capita income for the county was $24,686. About 3.30% of families and 5.40% of the population were below the poverty line, including 6.40% of those under age 18 and 4.50% of those age 65 or over.

 Education 
Public school districts serving Leelanau County include:

 Glen Lake Community Schools
 Leland Public School District
 Northport Public School District
 Suttons Bay Public Schools
 Traverse City Area Public Schools

Communities

Cities
 Traverse City (partially)

Villages
 Empire
 Northport
 Suttons Bay

Charter township
 Elmwood Charter Township

Civil townships

 Bingham Township
 Centerville Township
 Cleveland Township
 Empire Township
 Glen Arbor Township
 Kasson Township
 Leelanau Township
 Leland Township
 Solon Township
 Suttons Bay Township (county seat)

Census-designated places
 Cedar
 Glen Arbor
 Greilickville
 Lake Leelanau
 Leland
 Maple City
 Omena

Unincorporated communities

 Bingham
 Burdickville
 Fouch
 Fountain Point
 Glen Haven
 Isadore
 Keswick
 Northport Point
 Peshawbestown
 Solon

 Ghost towns 

Ahgosatown
Bodus
Crescent
Crystal Spring
Good Harbor
Hatchs
Heimforth
Jacktown
Kasson
North Unity
Onominese
Oviatt
Port Oneida
Schomberg
Waukazooville

Indian reservation
 Grand Traverse Band of Ottawa and Chippewa Indians occupies scattered areas within Suttons Bay Township.

Notable people
 Jim Harrison – author, long-time resident of Leland Township
 Kathleen Sebelius – former Secretary of US Health and Human Services and former governor of Kansas, vacations at a summer home built by her grandfather in Leland.

 The northernmost village of Northport and surrounding Leelanau Township have achieved fame as an area where the rich and famous can live quietly and anonymously. According to the Leelanau Visitors Guide: "Chef Mario Batali lives north of town at Cathead point, and comedian and actor Tim Allen routinely spent summers in Northport until his divorce. Financier Mark Spitznagel summers in Northport Point, a posh community just outside the village."

See also
 List of Michigan State Historic Sites in Leelanau County, Michigan
 National Register of Historic Places listings in Leelanau County, Michigan

Notes

References

Further reading
 Bogue, Margaret. Around the Shores of Lake Michigan: A Guide to Historic Sites. Madison, WI: University of Wisconsin Press, 1985.
 Reed, Earl H. The Dune Country. Berrien Springs, MI: Hardscrabble Books, 1979. [Reprint of 1916 Edition].
 Ruchhoft, Robert H. Exploring North Manitou, South Manitou, High and Garden Islands of the Lake Michigan Archipelago. Cincinnati, OH: Pucelle Press, 1991.
 Wood, Mable C. Scooterville'', U.S.A. Grand Rapids, MI: Eerdmans, 1962.

External links
 [Official website|http://www.leelanau.cc Leelanau County - website]
 Leelanau Peninsula Chamber of Commerce
 Glen Arbor Chamber of Commerce
 Leland Chamber of Commerce
 Northport-Omena Chamber of Commerce
 Suttons Bay Chamber of Commerce
 The Leelanau Enterprise (local newspaper)
 Leelanau.com (news, photos & links)
 The Leelanau Post
 Fountain Point Resort website
 Leelanau Fruit Company website

 
Michigan counties
1863 establishments in Michigan
Populated places established in 1863
Traverse City micropolitan area